Karim Koshteh (also Romanized as Karīm Koshteh) is a village in Dust Mohammad Rural District, in the Central District of Hirmand County, Sistan and Baluchestan Province, Iran. At the 2006 census, its population was 650, in 146 families.

References 

Populated places in Hirmand County